Mount Orizaba is the highest peak on Santa Catalina Island, California, United States. On January 10, 1949,  of snow fell on the mountain. There is an FAA VORTAC installation at the summit. It is named after Pico de Orizaba, the tallest peak in Mexico.

References

External links
 
 

Orizaba
Landforms of the Channel Islands of California
Orizaba